Mycothele is a fungal genus in the family Gloeophyllaceae. Circumscribed by Swiss mycologist Walter Jülich in 1976, the genus is monotypic, containing the single species Mycothele disciformis.

References

Gloeophyllales
Monotypic Basidiomycota genera
Taxa named by Walter Jülich